Sihuidong Station is a station on Line 1 and the  of the Beijing Subway.

Station layout 
The station has 2 side platforms each on ground level for both Line 1 and Batong line. From 29 August 2021, only the Batong line platforms are used.

Exits 
There are two exits, lettered A and B. Exit A is accessible.

Gallery

References

Beijing Subway stations in Chaoyang District
Railway stations in China opened in 1999